Daxin is a town under the administration of Wuhe County, Anhui, China. , it has nine villages under its administration:
Daxin Village
Zhangwei Village
Xinbei Village
Maotan Village
Liuduo Village
Futai Village
Guofu Village
Hantai Village
Goubei Village

References 

Township-level divisions of Anhui
Wuhe County